Ilario Cortesi, C.R. (1545 – September 1608) was a Roman Catholic prelate who was Bishop of Policastro (1605–1608).

Cortesi was born in Naples, Italy, and ordained a priest in the Congregation of Clerics Regular of the Divine Providence. On 10 October 1605, he was appointed by Pope Leo XI as Bishop of Policastro. He wserved as Bishop of Policastro until his death.

See also
Catholic Church in Italy

References

External links and additional sources
 (for Chronology of Bishops) 
 (for Chronology of Bishops) 

1545 births
1608 deaths
Clergy from Naples
16th-century Italian Roman Catholic bishops
17th-century Italian Roman Catholic bishops
Bishops appointed by Pope Leo XI
Theatine bishops